The 2013 Charlottesville Men's Pro Challenger was a professional tennis tournament played on hard courts. It was the fifth edition of the tournament which was part of the 2013 ATP Challenger Tour. It took place in Charlottesville, United States between October 28 and November 3, 2013.

Singles main-draw entrants

Seeds

 1 Rankings are as of October 22, 2013.

Other entrants
The following players received wildcards into the singles main draw:
  Mitchell Frank
  Jarmere Jenkins
  Noah Rubin
  Mac Styslinger

The following players received entry from the qualifying draw:
  Kevin King
  Joshua Milton
  David Rice
  Laurent Rochette

Champions

Singles

 Michael Russell def.  Peter Polansky, 7–5, 2–6, 7–6(7–5)

Doubles

 Steve Johnson /  Tim Smyczek def.  Jarmere Jenkins /  Donald Young, 6–4, 6–3

External links
Official Website

Charlottesville Men's Pro Challenger
Charlottesville Men's Pro Challenger